Bateshwar Hembram  is an Indian politician. He was a Member of Parliament, representing Dumka in the Lok Sabha the lower house of India's Parliament as a member of the Indian National Congress.

References

External links
Official biographical sketch in Parliament of India website

Lok Sabha members from Bihar
Indian National Congress politicians
India MPs 1977–1979
20th-century births
Possibly living people
Indian National Congress politicians from Bihar